A veteran, often referred to as a military veteran or war veteran, is a person who has served in the armed forces.

Veteran or Veterans or The Veteran may also refer to:

Places

United States
 Veteran, Nevada
 Veteran, New York
 Veteran, Ulster County, New York
 Veteran, Wyoming
 Veterans Stadium (New Britain, Connecticut)
 Veterans Stadium, Philadelphia, Pennsylvania

Other places
 Veteran, Alberta, Canada
 Veteran, Queensland, Australia

People
 Julius the Veteran (3rd century), a Roman soldier and saint

Arts, entertainment, and media

Films
 The Veteran (1972 film), horror film
 The Veteran (2006 film), a 2006 American made-for-TV war film
 The Veteran (2011 film), a 2011 British action film
 Veteran (2015 film), a 2015 South Korean film

Literature
 The Veteran (short story collection), a book by Frederick Forsyth and the titular story
 The Veteran, a novel by Stephen Crane

Music
 Veteran (Marques Houston album), 2007 album by American R&B artist Marques Houston
 Veteran (JPEGMafia album), 2018 album by American rapper JPEGMafia
 "The Veteran", a song by British clergyman and composer Joseph Philip Knight

Television
 "Veterans" (Justified), a 2010 episode of Justified

Ships
 French ship Vétéran (1803)
 HMS Veteran, the name of three ships of the Royal Navy

Other uses
 Veteran car, a car built before 1905
 Veteran tree, trees of distinction due to age

See also
 Sons of Veterans (disambiguation)
 Veterans Administration Hospital (disambiguation)
 Veterans Bridge (disambiguation)
 Veterans Day (disambiguation)
 Veterans Memorial Auditorium (disambiguation)